This article covers the cultural history of the United States since its founding in the late 18th century. The region has had patterns of original settlement by different peoples, & later settler colonial states & societal setups. Various immigrant groups have been at play in the formation of the nation's culture. While different ethnic groups may display their own insular cultural aspects, throughout time a broad American culture has developed that encompasses the entire country. Developments in the culture of the United States in modern history have often been followed by similar changes in the rest of the world (American cultural imperialism).

This includes  knowledge, customs, and arts of Americans; and events in the social, cultural, and political spheres.

Justice system
Prior to the early 19th century, people were infrequently jailed. Jails were considered too expensive and could not competently secure a criminal for a lengthy period. Those convicted were either flogged, placed in stocks for a time, or hanged. In 1829, an attempt was made to reform (induce repentance in) convicts by incarcerating them in a penitentiary. Strict silence was enforced. This model was widely copied and persisted for nearly a century. Authorities conceded failure when those incarcerated often went insane through lack of social contact.

See also
Architecture of the United States
Christianity in the United States
Counterculture of the 1960s
Cuisine of the United States
History of education in the United States
History of women in the United States
United States religious history
Entertainment:
Cinema of the United States
Television in the United States
Sports in the United States
Theater of the United States 
Video gaming in the United States
Fine arts:

Dance of the United States
Literature of the United States
Music history of the United States
Music of the United States
Poetry of the United States
Sculpture of the United States
Visual arts of the United States

Notes